Michael Flynn (born 1958) is a retired U.S. Army lieutenant general and former National Security Advisor to Donald Trump.

Michael or Mike Flynn may also refer to:

Sport

 Michael Flynn (footballer) (born 1980), Welsh footballer and football manager
 Mike Flynn (footballer) (born 1969), English footballer
 Mike Flynn (American football) (born 1974), American football player
 Mike Flynn (baseball) (1872–1941), American baseball player
 Mike Flynn (basketball) (born 1953), American basketball player

Others
 Michael Flynn (writer) (born 1947), American science fiction author
 Michael J. Flynn (born 1934), American computer engineer
 Mike Flynn (editor) (1968–2016), American website editor
 Mike Flynn (Sea Patrol), fictional character portrayed by Ian Stenlake
 Mike Flynn (government administrator), acting deputy administrator of the United States Environmental Protection Agency
 Michael Flynn (businessman), Irish businessman
 Mike Flynn, American radio host of The Folk Sampler

See also
 Mick Flynn (born 1960), British soldier
 Mickey Finn (disambiguation)